is a passenger railway station located in  Kanagawa-ku, Yokohama, Kanagawa Prefecture, Japan, operated by the private railway company Keikyū.

Lines
Keikyū Shinkoyasu Station is served by the Keikyū Main Line and is located 18.3 kilometers from the terminus of the line at Shinagawa  Station in Tokyo.

Station layout
The station consists of two ground-level opposed side platforms  connected to the station building by a footbridge.

Platforms

History
It was renamed  on November 1, 1943 to distinguish it from the nearby Shin-Koyasu Station on the Japanese Government Railway (JGR) system. The station was rebuilt as an elevated station in February 1979. The station assumed its present name from June 1, 1987.

Keikyū introduced station numbering to its stations on 21 October 2010; Keikyū Shinkoyasu Station was assigned station number KK32.

Passenger statistics
In fiscal 2019, the station was used by an average of 8,399 passengers daily. 

The passenger figures for previous years are as shown below.

Surrounding area
 Shin-Koyasu Station
 Yokohama Shinkoyasu Post Office
Asano Junior & Senior High School

See also
 List of railway stations in Japan

References

External links

 

Railway stations in Kanagawa Prefecture
Railway stations in Japan opened in 1910
Keikyū Main Line
Railway stations in Yokohama